Sweethearts of the U.S.A. is a 1944 American musical comedy film directed by Lewis D. Collins and starring Una Merkel, Harry Parke and Donald Novis. In Britain it was released under the alternative title of Sweethearts on Parade.

The film's sets were designed by the art director Paul Palmentola.

Plot

Cast

References

Bibliography
 John Russell Taylor & Arthur Jackson. The Hollywood musical. McGraw-Hill Book Co., 1971.

External links
 

1944 films
1944 musical comedy films
1940s English-language films
American musical comedy films
Films directed by Lewis D. Collins
Monogram Pictures films
American black-and-white films
1940s American films